The Chap-Book was an American literary magazine between 1894 and 1898. It is often classified as one of the first "little magazines" of the 1890s.

The first edition of The Chap-Book was dated 15 May 1894. Its editor was Herbert Stuart Stone and it was published by Stone and Kimball. It was originally published in Cambridge, Massachusetts, but after six months moved to Chicago, Illinois when Stone and Kimball relocated to Chicago.

The Chap-Book was published twice monthly. Its final issue was issued on 1 July 1898. After this, it merged with The Dial. 

Contributors to The Chap-Book included Henry James, Hamlin Garland, Eugene Field, Bliss Carman, Julian Hawthorne, Max Beerbohm, W. E. Henley, H. G. Wells and William Sharp.

References

James D. Hart (1986). The Concise Oxford Companion to American Literature (New York: Oxford University Press) s.v. "Chap-Book, The".

External links

The Chap-Book: Magazine Data File
Stone and Kimball Collection: Late nineteenth- and early twentieth-century publications of Stone and Kimball, (182 titles). From the Rare Book and Special Collections Division at the Library of Congress

1894 establishments in Massachusetts
1898 disestablishments in Illinois
Bimonthly magazines published in the United States
Defunct literary magazines published in the United States
Magazines established in 1894
Magazines disestablished in 1898
Magazines published in Boston
Magazines published in Chicago